The acronym NSTU may refer to:

Pago Pago International Airport, a public airport of the United States.
Noakhali Science & Technology University, a public university of Bangladesh.
Nova Scotia Teachers Union, a labour organization in Canada.
Novosibirsk State Technical University, a public university of Russia.